Ziaeddin Tavakkoli Bivarzeni (1925–2009), was a Northern Iranian politician and merchant. He encouraged Reza Shah (the Iranian king) to approve Rudbar as a Shahrestan, an equivalent of a county in Iran.

References
Book of Amarlu - M.M.Zand

1925 births
2009 deaths
People from Rudbar
20th-century Iranian politicians